Cherokee Park is a  municipal park located in Louisville, Kentucky, United States and is part of the Louisville Olmsted Parks Conservancy. It was designed in 1891 by Frederick Law Olmsted, the father of landscape architecture along with 18 of Louisville's 123 parks.  Beargrass Creek runs through much of the park, and is crossed by numerous pedestrian and automobile bridges.

According to The Trust for Public Land, Cherokee Park has 500,000 visitors annually, making it tied for the 69th most popular municipal park in the United States.

The park features a 2.4 mile Scenic Loop through the park's pastoral setting featuring rolling hills, open meadows and woodlands with separate lanes for vehicle traffic (one-way) and recreational users. The park was closed to vehicular traffic in April of 2020 to aid in social distancing and as of May 2021 remains closed to automobiles indefinitely.

History

Cherokee Park opened in 1891, has always been a major draw, and was a key factor in sparking development in nearby parts of town.

Pre-development

The land comprising Cherokee Park was originally part of a  military land grant in 1773 to James Southall and Richard Charlton.

A  portion of the land passed to Judge Joshua Fry Bullitt, who sold it in 1868 to foundry magnate Archibald P. Cochran. Cochran established an estate there called Fern Cliff, which operated as a museum for a while but has since been demolished.

As the land was located around Beargrass Creek, it was hilly and ill-suited to farming. Prior to its conversion as a park, the land was used primarily for animal grazing, although much of it was wooded. By 1893 the land was carved into six estates, including Cochran's (which was sold to the city after his death in 1889). The other estates belonged to the Bonnycastle , Barret , Morton & Griswold , Alexander  families, respectively. Those and two small lots under  were bought by 1891. Additional land from the Longest, Barringer and Belknap families would be added to expand the park to its modern size.

Park development

In 1887, a city park system was proposed with three large suburban parks: east, west and south. The initial name of the eastern park was to be Beargrass Park, but in 1891, as was fashionable in the late 19th century, a name that evoked the romantic imagery of Native Americans was chosen.

Cochran's name lives on in Cochran Hill, which became notable in the late 1960s when two tunnels were dug under it at a cost of $1.9 million so that I-64 would not have as extreme an impact on the park as it was run through it. Various groups, including one called Save Our Parks, formed as early as the 1940s to oppose running highways through the parks, and were largely responsible for forcing a tunnel as a compromise.

The tunnels, which opened in 1970, are one of three sites in Kentucky deemed "exceptionally significant" by the Federal Highway Administration. This designation, in turn, means it will be very difficult for the stretch of interstate running through the park ever to be widened.

In 2010, a proposal by the city to replace the Hogan's Fountain Pavilion with two smaller structures created public opposition that led to a citizen fundraising effort to repair the existing structure, rather than replace it.

Tornado damage in 1974

Much of the park was heavily damaged in the April 3, 1974, tornado Super Outbreak.  The tornado was an F4 on the Fujita scale. A city forester surveying the aftermath said, "I don't believe that anyone alive today will see Cherokee Park as it was before the storm."

Because of the loss of thousands of mature trees, a massive re-planting effort was undertaken, financed in large part by a grant from the United States government under the Disaster Relief Act of 1974. However, to qualify for these funds, the park had to be restored to its pre-tornado design as faithfully as possible. The original Olmsted plans were consulted for the park's "rebirth" (as it was called at the time), with 2,500 trees and 4,600 shrubs planted in the restoration effort.

Crime

Vandalism and petty crime has long plagued Cherokee Park. Vandalism was reported as early as 1936. In the 1950s into the mid-1960s newspapers reported with amusement on the serial theft of elements of the Hogan's Fountain monument – especially a bronze turtle – with headlines such as "Cherokee Park Turtle on the Loose Again" and "Bronze Turtle Steps Lively – Flees Cherokee Park Nest". According to a park commissioner, after the vandals saw the stories in print, they would always deposit the stolen pieces, which weighed about 100 pounds, somewhere in the park. Eventually they were all bolted down from beneath such that vandals were unable to remove them. More seriously, the Daniel Boone statue at the park's Eastern Parkway entrance was toppled on May 21, 1962, causing severe damage to it. Park officials claimed police had seen but not arrested a crowd of youths drinking openly near the statue earlier in the day, police denied the charge.

A 1970 newspaper article looked back on the tradition of turtle thievery with nostalgia, reporting that Hogan's Fountain had by the 1970s become a nightly gathering place for hundreds of teenagers, who openly sold and used drugs, despite an increasing police presence, usually arresting youths on loitering charges and chasing out dealers of more serious drugs such as heroin.

Portions of the park were redesigned both to remove popular loitering locations and to increase the park's usability to families and individuals for recreation. Combined with an increased police presence, these tactics greatly deterred drug use and gay cruising, however vandalism remains a minor problem.  During periods of good weather, the park  is invariably full of local residents engaged in a wide range of fitness activities as well as leisurely strolling or picnicking.  On those rare occasions that two or more inches of snow fall, hundreds of locals take to the parks hills for informal sledding and snowboarding.

Landmarks

Cherokee Park contains many landmarks and points of interest. Many are self-contained areas within the larger park, set apart from each other by the natural terrain and creative use of landscaping. Because of the size and design of the park, many events can occur at the same time without interrupting each other.

 Big Rock – A large rock in Beargrass Creek, which also lends its name to a picnic area and playground nearby. The rock itself is used for picnics, and as an ill-advised jumping spot (its flat surface offers about an  drop into the shallow creek water below). There is an open shelter building at Big Rock which was built in 1910 as a memorial to George Gaulbert, it was designed by William J. Dodd.
 Scenic Loop – A 2.43-mile (3.9-km) mixed-use road around much of the park, with separate lanes for pedestrians and motorized vehicles.
 Frisbee Field – A large open field used for many purposes, most commonly soccer and Ultimate.
 Baringer Hill – Commonly called "Dog Hill", "Kite Hill", or "Hill Number One". Once popular for kites, after a renovation in the late 1990s it has become better known as a gathering point for dog owners. A fenced dog park located at the top of Cochran Hill opened in 2007.
 Hogan's Fountain – A dog- and horse-watering fountain located atop a hill on the Scenic Loop, Hogan's Fountain was financed by the Hogan Family of Anchorage, Kentucky, in 1905.  The fountain was sculpted by Enid Yandell, and features the Greek God Pan. It was officially unveiled on August 31, 1905. The name Hogan's Fountain is also often extended to the nearby hilltop area, which includes a large gazebo, baseball diamond, children's fountains and a basketball court. This spot was once known as Bonnycastle Hill. Hogan's Fountain is a popular place for group meetings, family reunions and picnics.
 Lover's Lane – A secluded, heavily forested stretch of scenic loop just past Hogan's Fountain.
 Cochran Hill – A hillside between Frisbee Field and Lexington Road, and site of a dog park.
 Christensen Fountain – A recently restored fountain near the Lexington Road entrance.
 Nettleroth Bird Sanctuary – Located in a quiet corner of the park, between Scenic Loop and a residential neighborhood.
 Belknap Bridge – When Lily Buckner Belknap died in 1893, her husband Col. Morris Burke Belknap constructed a stone bridge in Cherokee Park in her honor.

Entrances

The park is situated in the Highlands.  As the city of Louisville expanded around the park, many developers donated land to the park in exchange for the right to connect roads to it.  The numerous entrances have made navigating the park notoriously confusing to visitors.  Neighborhoods with entrances to the park include Cherokee Triangle, Bonnycastle, Highlands-Douglass, Crescent Hill and Seneca Gardens.

Features

 Archery range – Near Beals Branch Road
 Ballfield – At Hogan's Fountain
 Baringer Spring – Rustic stream crossed by several wide wooden bridges and scenic walkways, entrances at Frisbee Field and at Baringer Hill
 Fullcourt basketball – At Hogan's Fountain
 Bike trail – Throughout park, crosses the scenic loop in many places. The scenic loop itself, with two moderately steep hills, is popular with road bikers.
 Bridle trail
 Golf course & clubhouse (9 holes). Opened in 1907.
 Hiking trails – All are mixed-use trails
 Horseshoe pits – At Hogan's Fountain
 Picnic pavilions – Large pagoda-style structure at Hogan's Fountain
 Picnic tables – At and near Hogan's Fountain
 Playgrounds – At Hogan's Fountain, Big Rock and Baringer Hill
 Rugby field – Also used for Frisbee and Soccer
 Restrooms – At Baringer Hill, Hogan's Fountain and Big Rock
 Spray pool – At Hogan's Fountain
 Willow Pond – Off Grinstead Drive, next to golf course (sometimes referred to incorrectly by locals as "Cherokee Lake"). Features in holes 5 and 6 on the golf course, and is crossed by the tee shot on hole 6. Stocked with bass, bluegill, carp, catfish and is seasonally stocked with trout by the state fish & wildlife agency.
 Gravity hill – On the Scenic Loop between Eastern Parkway and Barney Street.
 Dog run – Opened August 2007, located atop Cochran Hill

Activities

 Walking and hiking
 Running and jogging
 Golf
 Dog walking (Baringer Hill – aka "Dog Hill")
 Bike riding (trails and road)
 Fishing (willow pond)
 Sledding
 Picnics
 Baseball
 Basketball
 Football
 Rugby
 Soccer
 Ultimate frisbee
 Geocaching
 Archery
 Weddings (occasionally)
 Live action role-playing
 Ham radio, ARRL Field Day – 4th full weekend in June

Plants and animals
Cherokee Park is home to a surprising diversity of wildlife and plants. Eastern white tail deer, raccoon, gray fox, opossum, groundhogs, Eastern cottontail, gray squirrel, fox squirrel, snapping turtles, eastern box turtle, garter snakes, red tailed hawk, crows, beaver, the Louisville crayfish, and a handful of salamander varieties. Many different songbird species have been seen in the parks by the Beckham Bird Club and other naturalists. A flora of Cherokee Park and other Frederick Law Olmsted Parks was released in 2014 by Louisville botanist Patricia Dalton Haragan.

More recently, reports of coyotes in the park have become more widespread.  A 2016 Louisville Magazine article noted that "Cherokee Park acts as Costco for coyotes: squirrels, mice and chipmunks in bulk for eating, water to drink and hollow tree trunks or dense thickets galore for shelter."

See also
 City of Parks
 List of attractions and events in the Louisville metropolitan area
 List of parks in the Louisville metropolitan area

References

External links

Informational
 Olmsted History
 Cherokee Park — The Cultural Landscape Foundation
 Bike-Trail review
 Bike Trail Information
   Images of Cherokee Park (Louisville, Ky.) in the University of Louisville Libraries Digital Collections
 Save Hogan's Fountain Teepee Pavilion

Maps
 Official map
 Satellite image
 Trail map from Louisville
 Trail map from Olmsted Parks
 Map from Louisville

Groups and clubs
 Louisville Olmsted Parks Conservancy
 Cherokee Road Runners
 Louisville Rugby Club
 Kentucky Mountain Bike Association
 Louisville Ultimate Frisbee Association Plays games in Cherokee and nearby Seneca Parks
 Amateur Radio Transmitting Society Holds a ham radio field day at Baringer Hill on the 4th full weekend in June.

Parks in Louisville, Kentucky
Frederick Law Olmsted works
Dog parks in the United States
1891 establishments in Kentucky
Protected areas established in 1891
Golf clubs and courses in Kentucky